Apollinary Mikhaylovich Vasnetsov (6 August 1856 – 23 January 1933) was a Russian painter and graphic artist.  He specialised in scenes from the medieval history of Moscow.

Vasnetsov did not receive a formal artistic education. He had studied under his older brother, Viktor, also a famous painter. From 1883, he along with his brother lived and worked in Abramtsevo where he fell under the influence of Vasily Polenov. In 1898–1899, he travelled across Europe. In addition to epic landscapes of Russian nature, Apollinary Vasnetsov created his own genre of historical landscape reconstruction on the basis of historical and archaeological data. His paintings present a visual picture of medieval Moscow. He was a member of the Association of Travelling Art Exhibitions (Peredvizhniki) from 1899, and an academician from 1900. He became one of the founders and supervisors of the Union of Russian Artists.

Early life 
Vasnetsov had three elder and two younger brothers. His only sister died at the age of four months. Vasnetsov's father played an important role in the upbringing and education of his sons, teaching them to love nature and to become familiar with the life of birds and animals. Vasnetsov's father died in 1870, which came as a terrible blow for him.

The Caucasus and the Urals 
In 1890, Vasnetsov made a journey across the North of the Russian Empire and was able to record beautiful views of Siberia and the Urals, including the paintings:
 Forest on the Slopes of Mount Blagodat, Mid-Urals (1890)
 Boreal forest in the Urals (1890)
 Mountain lake in the Urals (1892)
 The Steppes of Orenburg (1895)
 "Koma" (1895)

In 1895, Vasnetsov visited the Caucasus. He was deeply impressed by the beauty of the rugged Caucasus mountains. While there, he climbed the glaciers of Mt. Elbrus, visited Tiflis and lived in the Darial Gorge. He created a great number of his sketches during this period, including:
 View of Elbrus from Bermomut (1895)
 Red Cliffs in Kislovodsk (1896)
 Elbrus before Sunrise (1897)
 Darial (1897)

In 1890, Vasnetsov made a journey across Europe, visiting France and Italy, where he studied the works of famous masters.

At the beginning of 1920, the Committee of Archaeology (the predecessor of the Community for the Saving of Art Monuments) invited Vasnetsov and several other painters (including Vikentii Trofimov) to draw the old places of Voronezh.

A minor planet, 3586 Vasnetsov, discovered by Soviet astronomer Lyudmila Zhuravlyova in 1978, is named after Viktor Vasnetsov and Apollinary Vasnetsov.

Gallery

See also
 List of Russian artists

References

Sources
Apollinary Vasnetsov by Vasnetsova, Yekaterina & Schmidt, Igor (eds.), Izobrazitelnoye Iskusstvo, Moscow, 1980, (Russian/English), Book ID V 1121 31.
 Great painters by Gordeeva M., "Direct media", Kyiv, 2011, (Russian)

Further reading 

Short biography 1
Short biography 2

1856 births
1933 deaths
People from Zuyevsky District
People from Vyatsky Uyezd
19th-century painters from the Russian Empire
Russian male painters
20th-century Russian painters
Russian watercolorists
Peredvizhniki
19th-century male artists from the Russian Empire
Burials at Vvedenskoye Cemetery
20th-century Russian male artists